The Society for Crypto-Judaic Studies ("SCJS"), founded in August 1990 by Rabbi Joshua Stampfer of Portland, Oregon, and Dr. Stanley Hordes of Santa Fe, New Mexico, is the major academic organization conducting and encouraging research on the Crypto-Jews of Spain and Portugal and their descendants today. This also involves significant attention being given to the Inquisition and to its ramifications for Sephardic Jews as well as for the general Jewish community.

Membership in the SCJS is composed of scholars interested in crypto-Jews, descendants of crypto-Jews, and others interested in the topic from a historical, sociological, anthropological, religious, ethnic, literary, philosophical, or other perspective. The Society is nonreligious, and membership is open to all. Today, there is much interest, both academic and personal, in the history and contemporary status of crypto-Jews, and a number of distinguished scholars have published in the area. Especially in recent years, a number of people, especially, but not limited to, Hispanics, have returned or converted to Judaism, frequently in part because of knowledge of a previously-suppressed Jewish heritage. New Mexico, Texas, Arizona, and California are major areas of interest, but significant interest also is found in Miami, Florida, Orlando, Florida, New York City, Portland, Oregon, and other areas with large numbers of Hispanics. This contemporary phenomenon of returning/converting also is of specific interest to some academic researchers.

The SCJS publishes HaLapid: The Journal of the Society for Crypto-Judaic Studies, a combination newsletter and journal. Published four times per year, HaLapid (Hebrew for The Torch) mostly includes refereed academic research articles, personal stories by descendants of crypto-Jews, and news items, but also includes occasional poetry, links for related websites, and other items of interest. The SCJC also hosts a website, and helps answer questions and make referrals for interested persons.

The Society for Crypto-Judaic Studies meets annually for a three-day conference which includes a keynote speaker, sessions on recent research findings, personal stories of returnees, business sessions, and various forms of entertainment. At the 2003 annual conference in San Antonio, Texas, the keynote speaker was retired Rabbi Samuel Lerer who spent much of his 51-year career working with anusim in Mexico. The SCJS has taken a lead in interest in DNA studies, especially as it applies to crypto-Jews, other Sephardim, and the Jewish community in general.

Notes
 Janet Liebman Jacobs, Hidden Heritage: The Legacy of the Crypto-Jews (2002), p. 13.
  The well-known Judaica author Cecil Roth popularized the term marranos in his 1932 book A History of the Marranos, but, because of the negative meaning attached to the word marrano by supporters of the Inquisition, today the term preferred by descendants and scholars is Crypto-Jews (i.e., Secret Jews), or anusim (Hebrew for forced ones)

External links
 Society for Crypto-Judaic Studies webpage

Judaic studies
Jewish history organizations
Sephardi Jewish culture in the United States
Crypto-Judaism
Research institutes established in 1990
1990 establishments in the United States